Elachista synopla is a moth of the family Elachistidae. It is found in Wyoming and Utah in the United States.

The length of the forewings is 5.6 mm. The basal fifth of the costa of the forewings is gray. The ground color is white with some brown scales in the distal half. The scales form an irregular spot in the middle of the wing at the fold and another at two-thirds of the wing. The hindwings are light gray and translucent. The underside of the wings is gray.

References

Moths described in 1948
synopla
Moths of North America